The Washington Metropolitan Area Transit Authority (WMATA  ), commonly referred to as Metro, is a tri-jurisdictional government agency that operates transit service in the Washington metropolitan area. WMATA was created by the United States Congress as an interstate compact between the District of Columbia, Maryland, and Virginia.

WMATA provides rapid transit service under the Metrorail name, fixed-route bus service under the Metrobus brand, and paratransit service under the MetroAccess brand.

The authority is also part of a public–private partnership that operates the DC Circulator bus system. WMATA has its own police force, the Metro Transit Police Department.

The authority's board of directors consists of two voting representatives each from the District of Columbia, Maryland, Virginia, and the U.S. federal government. Each jurisdiction also appoints two alternate representatives. WMATA has no independent taxation authority and depends on its member jurisdictions for capital investments and operating subsidies.

In addition to ongoing operations, WMATA participates in regional transportation planning. Recent projects include an extension of Metrorail to Dulles International Airport, and streetcar lines in the District and Northern Virginia.

History

Planning and creation 

Starting in the mid-19th century, the Washington area had been served by a variety of private bus lines and streetcar services, including extensions of Northern Virginia trolleys. Over time, most were absorbed into the Capital Transit Company, formed on December 1, 1933, by the amalgamation of the Washington Railway, Capital Traction, and Washington Rapid Transit. Financier Louis Wolfson acquired the company in 1949 but had his franchise revoked in 1955 amidst a crippling strike. Congress then awarded a 20-year concession to O. Roy Chalk on the condition that he replace the city's remaining streetcars with buses by 1963. The company was thereafter known as DC Transit.

In that same year, the Mass Transportation Survey attempted to forecast both freeway and mass transit systems sufficient to meet the needs of the Washington area in the year 1980. In 1959 the study's final report called for the construction of two rapid transit subway lines in downtown Washington. Congress responded to the report by enacting the National Capital Transportation Act of 1960 to coordinate future transportation planning for the area. The act created a new federal agency called the National Capital Transportation Agency (NCTA). However, the 1959 report also called for extensive freeway construction within the District of Columbia. Residents successfully lobbied for a moratorium on freeway construction in what became part of a movement called the "freeway revolts."

The NCTA's November 1962 Transportation in the National Capital Region report included a proposal for an 89-mile (143 km), $793 million rail system. The total cost of the proposed highway and rail system was less than the 1959 plan due to the elimination of controversial freeways. The plan was supported by President Kennedy, but opposed by highway advocates in Congress who reduced the rail system to only  within the District of Columbia. However, that proposal was defeated in Congress shortly after President Kennedy's death. The Urban Mass Transportation Act of 1964 passed Congress, which promised 66% federal funding for urban mass transportation projects. Encouraged by the new act, the NCTA recommended the formation of a private entity or a multi-state authority to operate the system using more non-federal funds. On September 8, 1965, President Johnson signed the National Capital Transportation Act of 1965 approving the construction of a  rapid transit system.

The NCTA negotiated with Virginia, Maryland and the District of Columbia for the formation of a new regional entity. The authority was created by an interstate compact, a special type of contract or agreement between one or more states. Pursuant to the Compact Clause of the U.S. Constitution, any such compact must be approved by Congress. After the Washington Metropolitan Area Transit Authority Compact was approved by the Maryland General Assembly in 1965, and passed through the Virginia General Assembly and Congress in 1966, WMATA was founded on February 20, 1967.

As a government agency, the compact grants WMATA sovereign immunity by all three jurisdictions in which it operates, and except for certain limited exceptions, the authority cannot be successfully sued unless it waives immunity. Under the provisions of the compact, the authority is legally incorporated in the District of Columbia, where WMATA maintains its headquarters.

Metro construction and operation 

WMATA broke ground for its train system in 1969. The first portion of the Metrorail system opened March 27, 1976, connecting Farragut North to Rhode Island Avenue on the Red Line. The  of the original 83-station system was completed on January 13, 2001, with the opening of Green Line's segment from Anacostia to Branch Avenue.

WMATA's bus system is a successor to four privately owned bus companies. While WMATA's original compact provided only for rail service, by 1970 the need for reliable bus services to connect passengers to rail stations led to calls for authority to overhaul the entire bus system as well. The compact was amended in 1971, allowing the authority to operate buses and take over bus companies. After months of negotiation with Chalk failed to produce an agreed price, on January 14, 1973, WMATA condemned DC Transit and its sister company, the Washington, Virginia and Maryland Coach Company and acquired their assets for $38.2 million. On February 4, it acquired the Alexandria, Barcroft and Washington Transit Company, which operated in Northern Virginia, and the WMA Transit Company of Prince George's County for $4.5 million. While AB&W and WMA Transit were in better financial condition than DC Transit, their owners did not wish to compete with a publicly owned bus system, and requested a takeover.

In 1979, an organization known as Metro 2001, Inc., planned to write a history of the development of the Metro system for WMATA using such documents as Congressional hearing transcripts, correspondence, and maps. However, this plan, known as the Metro History Project, was abandoned in 1985, and materials that had been collected up until that point (1930-1984) were donated to George Washington University. This collection of materials is currently under the care of GWU's Special Collections Research Center, located in the Estelle and Melvin Gelman Library.

In 1998, Congress changed the name of the Washington National Airport to the Ronald Reagan Washington National Airport, though the law did not allocate money to implement the name change. As a result, WMATA did not change the name of the National Airport station (which never included the full name of the airport). In response to repeated inquiries from Republican congressmen that the station be renamed, WMATA stated that stations are renamed only at the request of the local jurisdiction. Since both Arlington County and the District of Columbia were controlled by Democrats, the name change was blocked. Finally, in 2001, Congress made changing the station's name a condition of further federal funding.

Impacts of the Great Recession

In response to a demand for immediate repayment of a $43 million debt, WMATA sought a temporary restraining order against the KBC Bank Group. KBC claimed that the WMATA was in technical default of a contract following the collapse of American International Group, which had guaranteed the loan that KBC made to WMATA in 2002. The contract involved the sale to KBC of WMATA's rail cars, which were then leased back to WMATA. The transit agency asked for an injunction from the U.S. District Court for the District of Columbia on October 29, 2008.

After three days of negotiations in federal court, Judge Rosemary M. Collyer announced a settlement on November 14, 2008. WMATA had 14 similar lease agreements with other financial institutions when the KBC case went to trial. Waivers were requested from the banks to allow WMATA time to replace AIG with another insurer or guarantees by the federal government.

In 2009, WMATA issued two new series of municipal bonds bringing its total outstanding bonds to $390.9 million, as of June 30, 2010. This includes $55 million of Build America Bonds issued in 2009 under the American Recovery and Reinvestment Act of 2009 that are partially subsidized by the federal government.

However, most of the system's debt is financed directly by each local jurisdiction. In addition, WMATA was authorized to receive $202 million in grants from the federal government for American Recovery and Reinvestment Act projects. The funds are spent in 30 projects which include information technology, facilities maintenance, and vehicles and vehicle parts.

On January 14, 2010, General Manager John B. Catoe announced his resignation from Metro, effective April 2, 2010. He was replaced on April 3, 2010, by Interim General Manager Richard Sarles. Sarles became one of three finalists interviewing for the permanent position, and later became the permanent General Manager on January 27, 2011. Jack Requa became the Interim General Manager upon Sarles' retirement January 16, 2015.

Organization

Board of directors

WMATA was originally set up with a board of directors, of twelve members. Of those, six were voting members, and six were alternates. In response to the Passenger Rail Investment and Improvement Act of 2008, the WMATA Compact was amended on August 19, 2009, to allow the appointment of four additional board members by the federal government, bringing the total to sixteen.

, there were a total of sixteen board members: eight voting members and eight alternates. Virginia, Maryland, and the District had each appointed two voting members and two alternate members. The Federal Government, through the General Services Administration, is authorized to appoint up to two voting and two alternate members, but had appointed just two voting and one alternate members.

Board members serve without pay, but may be reimbursed for actual expenses. The board appoints a General Manager as CEO to supervise the day-to-day operation of the Authority. Under the terms of the "Procedures for WMATA Board of Directors", none of the individual board members, including the chairman, have any power to act regarding the operations of the Authority or to issue instructions to the General Manager or employees; only the entire board as a body has the power to instruct the General Manager. It states, "The authority of the Board of Directors is vested in the collective body and not in its individual Members. Accordingly, the Board, in establishing or providing any policies, orders, guidance, or instructions to the General Manager or WMATA staff, shall act as a body. No Member individually shall direct or supervise the General Manager or any WMATA employee or contractor."

The board approves WMATA's annual budget. The budget is approximately $3.1 billion in fiscal year 2019. In fiscal year 2019, 40.3% of revenues came from capital contributions, 23.2% from passenger revenues, 31.7% from local jurisdiction operating subsidies, 3.5% from interest income, 1.6% from advertising revenue, 0.9% from rental revenue, and 0.2% from other sources.

The WMATA board has the following standing committees: Executive, Finance and Capital, Capital & Strategic Planning, and Safety and Operation.

The position of board chairman rotates between the three jurisdictions. Article III Section 5 of the Compact specifies the method of appointment. The Compact prohibits WMATA from paying board members. However, Maryland pays its voting board members $20,000 per year and Virginia pays $50 per meeting. The District of Columbia does not compensate its board members.

On February 17, 2011, outgoing 2010–11 WMATA Board Chairman Peter Benjamin announced he was leaving the board and will be replaced by former Congressman Michael D. Barnes. On that date, the new Governance Committee of the WMATA board, which is chaired by Mary Hynes, held its first meeting and established a work plan to develop a new relationship between the board and WMATA management. The committee will draft new bylaws that will better define the role and term of the WMATA Board Chairman. The Governance Committee will also draft a code of conduct for board members.

Management
The General Manager is the chief executive officer of WMATA and leads all staff except that the General Counsel, Inspector General, and Board Secretary, who report directly to the board. WMATA has a Chief Safety Officer which reports to the general manager. The safety of the system is independently reviewed by the Tri-State Oversight Committee and the National Transportation Safety Board. On March 4, 2010, the Federal Transit Administration issued an Audit of the State Safety Oversight (SSO) program overseeing Metro which criticised the SSO as being underfunded and poorly trained. In response, Virginia, Maryland and the District of Columbia have increased their SSO funding and training for their employees responsible for safety oversight at Metro.

Jackson Graham, a retired general in the Army Corps of Engineers who supervised the planning and initial construction of the Metrorail system, was the first general manager. Graham retired in 1976, and was replaced by Theodore C. Lutz. Richard S. Page, head of the Urban Mass Transportation Administration (the name of the Federal Transit Administration until 1991), took over as general manager of WMATA in 1979. Page resigned in 1983, amid increasing financial difficulties for WMATA. and was replaced by Carmen E. Turner, who served for seven years. Former New York City Transit Authority chief, David L. Gunn, took over as head of WMATA in 1991, followed by Lawrence G. Reuter in 1994, and Richard A. White in 1996.

White led efforts to improve accountability and dialogue with passengers during 2005. This included independent audits, town hall meetings, online chats with White and other management officials, and improved signage in stations. White had three more years in his contract to work for Metro, but had come under fire for mismanagement; however, he was also "widely credited with saving the Metrobus system from collapse and with keeping Metro running during the terrorist attacks of Sept. 11, 2001." Despite these efforts, however, the Board of Directors dismissed White on January 11, 2006. Dan Tangherlini replaced White as interim General Manager, effective February 16, 2006.

Tangherlini was considered a leading candidate for Metro's top job on a permanent basis before he resigned to work as D.C. City Administrator under Mayor Adrian Fenty. On November 6, 2006, Tangherlini was replaced as interim general manager by Jack Requa, Metro's chief bus manager. John B. Catoe Jr., who was previously the Deputy Chief Executive Officer of the Los Angeles County Metropolitan Transportation Authority, became the agency's eighth permanent General Manager on January 25, 2007. He resigned three years later following the deadliest crash in the Metrorail system's history.

On April 3, 2010, the Board of Directors appointed Richard Sarles, former Executive Director of New Jersey Transit, as interim General Manager. Sarles, 65, was offered the position of permanent General Manager but declined the appointment at that time. However, on January 27, 2011, the Board announced that Sarles accepted the position as WMATA's permanent General Manager.

With Sarles' retirement, the post of General Manager was filled by Paul Wiedefeld on November 30, 2015.

On January 18, 2022, WMATA announced that Paul Wiedefeld would be retiring from Metro in 6 months and WMATA's Board Of Directors will be conducting a national search for his replacement. On May 10, 2022, WMATA announced that current president and CEO of Capital Metropolitan Transportation Authority Randy Clarke as its new General Manager and CEO beginning in summer 2022. On May 16, 2022, Wiedefeld announced he will retire early with Andy Off being the interim General Manager.

Regional coordination
The agency's charter directs WMATA to create a unified regional transit system by coordinating other public and private agencies within its jurisdiction. Examples of its coordination efforts include: reducing unnecessary, duplicate services by other local transit systems, providing "SmarTrip" farecards for buses operated by other local transit agencies, and adding local bus schedules and commuter rail routes (such as Maryland's MARC and Virginia's VRE) to WMATA's online "Trip Planner" guide.

Transit Police

Congress established the Metro Transit Police Department (MTPD) on June 4, 1976. MTPD police officers have jurisdiction and arrest powers for crimes that occur throughout the  Transit Zone that includes Maryland, Virginia, and the District of Columbia.

Inspector general
The Office of Inspector General was originally authorized by Board Resolution 2006–18, approved by the WMATA Board on April 20, 2006. With the amendments enacted on August 19, 2009, the Office of Inspector General became part of the WMATA Compact. This change was one of the requirements for the $1.5 billion federal grant offered by the Passenger Rail Investment and Improvement Act of 2008. Helen Lew became the Metro's first Inspector General on May 14, 2007, establishing the WMATA Office of Inspector General. Her appointment by the Board of Directors replaced the former Auditor General's Office. On April 17, 2017, Geoffrey Cherrington replaced Lew, who retired, as Inspector General, Unlike the Auditor General, the Inspector General and his office report directly to the Board and are organizationally independent of WMATA management.

Services

Metrorail

Since opening in 1976, the Metrorail network has grown to include six lines, 97 stations, and 129 miles (208 km) of track. It is the third-busiest rapid transit system in the United States in number of passenger trips, after the New York City Subway and Chicago "L". The record for daily ridership was 1.12 million on January 20, 2009, the day of Barack Obama's first Presidential Inauguration, followed by the Women's March on January 21, 2017, with 1,001,613 trips. In 2016, Metrorail had nearly 180 million trips. Fares vary based on the distance traveled and the time of day. Riders enter and exit the system using a proximity card known as SmarTrip. SmarTrip cards can also be used on a smartphone through Apple Pay and Google Pay. Magnetic stripe tickets stopped being accepted on March 6, 2016. Metrorail's frequency of service and fares vary depending on the available subsidy, the particular transit line, and the distance traveled.

Metro offers parking for commuters at 44 Metrorail stations. Most lots are on a first-come, first-served basis and fill up quickly each day. Thirty-six stations offer reserved parking, with customers purchasing permits to park in specified spaces. Four Metrorail stations (Greenbelt, Huntington, Franconia–Springfield, and Wiehle-Reston East) have spaces reserved for multi-day parking for up to ten days. Parking fees are paid by SmarTrip card or credit card. Cash payments are not accepted for parking fees.

Metroway

Metroway is a bus rapid transit (BRT) service that began on August 24, 2014. The first phase is the Crystal City/Potomac Yard Transitway, which operates on Route 1 in Arlington and Alexandria, Virginia. The first 0.8 mile segment in Alexandria runs on a transit lane only. The Arlington County segment began construction in the summer of 2014 and opened April 17, 2016. Metroway originally operated between the Braddock Road and  stations and was expanded to Pentagon City in April 2016. Thirteen 2016 New Flyer Xcelsior XN40 CNG buses (2981–2993) operate with the blue-and-white Metroway livery. The original Metroway fleet consisted of thirteen 2014 NABI 42 BRT diesel-electric hybrid buses (8002–8014) until they were all repainted in December 2016. The Metroway service, which is operated by Metrobus' Four Mile Run bus division, features dedicated bus lanes, transit signal priority, real-time information, custom designed shelters and stations, as well as near-level boarding at station platforms. A Metroway fare costs the same as Metrobus, which is $2.00 (using cash & SmarTrip).

Metrobus

There are 269 bus routes serving 11,129 stops, including 2,554 bus shelters. Metrobus had 130.8 million trips in 2016. On a typical weekday, it provides more than 400,000 trips.

The route numbering represents its region of operation. To differ the regions numbering system, letters for Maryland routes appear before the route number and the ones for Virginia routes appear after it. For example, A12 serves Maryland, and 17M serves Virginia.

MetroAccess

MetroAccess is a paratransit service that WMATA provides through private contractors. It began operation in May 1994 and since that time annual ridership has grown from 200,000 to more than 2.4 million passengers. MetroAccess operates 365 days a year, providing door-to-door, shared rides reserved from one to seven days in advance. It is now the sixth-largest paratransit service in the United States with a fleet of more than 600 vehicles and more than 1,000 employees. WMATA staff determines eligibility to use the service in response to written applications. The cost per passenger for MetroAccess is significantly higher than its fixed-route counterparts, and Metro has worked to provide as many opportunities to encourage and facilitate the use of fixed-route transit by its customers with disabilities.

Art in transit

WMATA includes art works at stations and sometimes on the trains. Twenty-nine stations include artwork. Funding for the art comes from several sources, including the town in which the station is located, the WMATA art program, the Federal Transit Administration, local art groups, and some pieces are gifts or on loan. WMATA has solicited feedback from riders concerning art in the stations and to guide choices on future installations.

Funding

Fares and other revenue fund 57.6% of the Metro's daily operations while state and local governments fund the remaining 42.4%. Since the Metro's inception, the federal government has provided grants for 65% of the system's capital costs. Metrorail is unusual among major public transportation systems in having no dedicated source of funding. Instead, each year WMATA must ask each local jurisdiction to contribute funding, which is determined by a formula that equally considers three factors:
 population density, as of the 2000 Census;
 average weekday ridership;
 number of stations in each jurisdiction.

Under this formula, the District of Columbia contributes the greatest amount (37.5%), followed by Prince George's County (20.8%), Montgomery County (16.6%), Fairfax County (13.5%), and 11.6% from all other jurisdictions. From time to time, a local jurisdiction will agree to subsidize a specific fare, with the jurisdiction funding the cost of the subsidy in addition to its contribution under the above formula. For example, the District of Columbia subsidized the fares charged at Metrorail stations located in economically challenged neighborhoods.

The cost of Metrobus is allocated under a formula that considers the excess of expenses over revenues from specific bus routes. The cost of MetroAccess is allocated under a different formula, which divides MetroAccess costs by the number of trips requested by riders who reside in each jurisdiction.

In 2004 the Brookings Institution released a report entitled "Deficits by Design" that found the agency's serious budgetary challenges owe in large part to its problematic revenue base. Most notably, Brookings found that WMATA's extraordinary lack of dedicated funding sources has necessitated an over-reliance on annually appropriated support that makes the agency vulnerable to perennial financial crises. As a result, the region's political and business leaders created a committee to look at new ways to fund the system, including some type of dedicated tax.

Title VI of the Passenger Rail Investment and Improvement Act of 2008, signed into law by President George W. Bush on October 16, 2008, authorized a grant of $1.5 billion over a 10-year period for Metrorail capital maintenance projects. The grant was contingent upon the establishment of dedicated revenue sources for the Metro by the Compact jurisdictions. An amendment to the Metro's Compact on August 19, 2009, added the requirement for payments "from dedicated funding sources" by the Compact's participating jurisdictions. In June 2010, Virginia Governor Bob McDonnell threatened to withhold Virginia's WMATA funding unless the composition of WMATA's board is modified to allow Virginia's Governor to appoint two of the four Virginia seats, instead of the localities. On June 17, 2010, Federal Transit Administrator Peter Rogoff required a formal commitment from Virginia to match its share of the federal funds if the federal funding is to continue. On July 1, 2010, the WMATA Board of Directors agreed to provide matching funds without regard to McDonnell's request for Board seats. Based on this agreement, the federal funds were reconfirmed, and WMATA was able to proceed with a contract to purchase 428 new Metrorail cars. McDonnell pressed for a Board seat again in 2011, and used his amendatory veto authority to amend the 2010-11 budget to require the NVTC to appoint someone of the Governor's choosing to fill one of the NVTC seats on the WMATA Board.

In the course of considering a continuing resolution for federal fiscal year 2011, the U.S. House of Representatives sought to defund all "earmarks" including the $150 million annual installment toward the $1.5 billion in federal matching funds. On February 16, 2011, Rep. Gerry Connolly (D-Va.) offered an amendment to reallocate $150 million from farm subsidy payments to meet this obligation, but the amendment was ruled out of order. The suspension of the federal appropriation also calls into question the matching funds from the individual jurisdictions for capital projects. On March 1, 2010, Republican Virginia Governor Bob McDonnell wrote to Congress urging the continuation of the federal funds. The continuing resolution for the remainder of 2011 ultimately included the federal matching funds.

On June 24, 2010, WMATA adopted a six-year capital spending plan totalling $5 billion. The plan is funded by the $3 billion from the 2008 Act, the American Recovery and Reinvestment Act of 2009, and increased funding from the participating jurisdictions. The plan includes rebuilding much of its infrastructure for improved safety. The NTSB had recommended replacing Metrorail's oldest series of railcars as not crashworthy, and the spending plan would replace those cars.

The 57% funding of WMATA from fares and other revenue compares with New York City's Metropolitan Transportation Authority which receives 53% of its funding from fares and car tolls. The Metropolitan Atlanta Rapid Transit Authority receives of 31.8% of its funding from fares.

In an effort to gain revenues, WMATA has started to allow retail ventures in Metrorail stations. WMATA has authorized DVD-rental vending machines and ticket booths for the Old Town Trolley Tours and is seeking additional retail tenants.

The WMATA staff preliminary budget for 2011-12 shows an $89 million operating deficit. This deficit can be addressed by fare increases, service reductions, or increased subsidies from the participating local jurisdictions.

Controversy

Safety

In recent years, WMATA has drawn criticism for a neglect of safety in both its rail and bus systems. Problems include failures within the system designed to prevent train collisions and escalators failing or breaking apart while in service. The National Transportation Safety Board (NTSB) has recommended that WMATA invest $1 billion in needed safety improvements. A December 2008 report by the WMATA Inspector General documented that Metro's System Safety and Risk Management Office was bypassed when changes were made to Metrorail's operating procedures, even though that office's review and approval was required as a matter of policy. On June 22, 2009, two Metrorail trains collided between the Takoma and Fort Totten Metro stations, killing nine. In February 2011, the National Transportation Safety Board conducted a public hearing during which witnesses testified about problems with the safety culture at WMATA. The NTSB's final report on the accident commented that "[t]he failure of WMATA engineers and technicians or managers to properly address track circuit anomalies is symptomatic of the larger safety culture issues within the organization."

Safety concerns have grown to the point that the region's Congressional delegation introduced the "National Metro Safety Act of 2011," which would establish federal safety standards for heavy rail mass transit systems. In response, WMATA is replacing its track control system and ordered an immediate inspection of all of its escalators. That inspection showed that over 10 percent of the escalators had faulty brakes.

The service state of elevators and escalators is of public concern. WMATA posts a webpage that is updated daily to notify users of elevator and escalator outages. WMATA makes track announcements that contradict industry safety standards, encouraging passengers to "stay clear of moving parts", encouraging people to stand on one side, and slowing the operating speed, which has the effect of encouraging walking on the escalators.

Closed-circuit television cameras monitor every Metrobus and every Metrorail station.

Discrimination
In 1990, Christine Townsend sued WMATA in the Washington federal district court on the basis of sexual discrimination. She won, with the court noting in the outcome of Townsend v. Washington Metro. Area Transit Auth. that the WMATA explanation had "many unexplained inconsistencies, irregularities, and holes".

Former Metro workers claim that WMATA consistently passes over non-black applicants or workers for employment or promotion.

In May 2015, the WMATA board voted to ban advocacy advertising after the American Freedom Defense Initiative sought to purchase advertisements in five subway stations and on twenty buses depicting Muhammad.

Future expansion

WMATA and its local jurisdictions developed a six-year, $5 billion "Capital Improvement Program" (CAP) which took effect on July 1, 2010, and expired on June 30, 2016. Under CAP, the local jurisdictions will fund capital projects (through the sale of municipal bonds) with matching funds provided by the federal government. CAP projects include purchasing new rail cars, rehabilitating three rail lines, replacing three bus garages, implementation of NTSB safety recommendations and purchasing new track maintenance equipment and overhauling Metrorail station elevators and escalators.

Metrorail's newest line was given the colour silver. The Silver Line's Phase I extended service to the Tysons Corner area of Virginia, with further extension planned to Ashburn, Virginia. Phase I through Tysons Corner to Reston (at the Wiehle–Reston East station) opened July 26, 2014, while Phase II to Ashburn, Virginia opened on November 15, 2022. Phase II includes a connection to Dulles International Airport. The Silver Line is financed through toll increases on the Dulles Toll Road as well as a $900 million federal grant and a special taxing district on adjacent commercial properties. In contrast, a proposed new $270-million Potomac Yard station on the Blue and Yellow Lines north of Braddock Road is to be funded by a special taxing district that will cover commercial properties and perhaps residential properties as well. The station will be opened in early 2023.

There has also been speculation about an extension of the Green Line northward to Baltimore's BWI Airport, There was also talk of extending the Green either to National Harbor or to White Plains via Waldorf. An extension from Franconia/Springfield to Fort Belvoir is also a possibility due to the Base Realignment and Closure process which relocated thousands of area defense jobs at Fort Belvoir in 2012. While there has been much discussion about all of these extensions, none are in any official planning stage. There as also been plans to extend the Orange Line to Centreville and Bowie.

Regarding Metrobus improvements, former General Manager Sarles reported, "Bus service will benefit from new technology that integrates fare box, destination signage and next bus systems to improve our reliability and customer information delivery. And, we will begin work in certain priority bus corridors that will deliver faster travel times for bus customers. Additionally, I look forward to working with the District of Columbia on potential bus rapid transit service improvements, such as curb running and signal preference to make bus service even more attractive, efficient, and an even more powerful antidote to traffic congestion."

Energy efficiency initiatives
WMATA reached an agreement in 2013 with the sustainable lighting division at Philips Electronics North America to switch to LEDs at no upfront cost. WMATA and Philips agreed to a ten-year maintenance contract through the $2 million savings the LEDs will provide each year.

See also
List of railroads in Washington, D.C.
Washington Metro
List of United States railroads
Metrobus (Washington, D.C.)
MetroAccess
SmarTrip – payment system for use of Metro transportation and Metro parking

References

Bibliography

External links

 
 Library holdings of books, maps, etc, relating to the Washington Metropolitan Area Transit Authority (WMATA)
 Guide To The Washington Metropolitan Area Transit Authority: Metro History Project Collection, 1930-1984, Special Collections Research Center, Estelle and Melvin Gelman Library, The George Washington University

 
United States interstate agencies
Underground rapid transit in the United States
Transit authorities with natural gas buses
1967 establishments in Washington, D.C.